Geraint Jones (born 1976) is a former England and Papua New Guinea cricketer. 

Geraint Jones may also refer to
Geraint Jones (educator), British educator
Geraint Dyfed Barri Jones (1936–1999), English classical scholar and archaeologist
Geraint Rhys Jones (born 1987), Welsh rugby union player
Geraint Stanley Jones (c.1936–2015), Welsh television executive

See also
Geraint Johnes, Welsh economist